

References 

Orders, decorations, and medals of Mauritius
Mauritius-related lists
Mauritius